Saxtorpsskogen is a bimunicipal locality situated in Landskrona Municipality and Kävlinge Municipality in Skåne County, Sweden with 973 inhabitants in 2010.

References 

Populated places in Kävlinge Municipality
Populated places in Landskrona Municipality
Populated places in Skåne County